Olallie State Park is a public recreation area featuring multiple waterfalls located  southeast of North Bend, Washington. The state park spans a  stretch along the South Fork of the Snoqualmie River. The most prominent feature of the park is  Twin Falls.

History
The park originated in 1950, when Washington State Parks purchased a 160-acre parcel from Puget Sound Power and Light. Originally named Twin Falls State Park, following the park's expansion in 1976 its name was changed to Olallie, after a Chinook word for the berries which are common in the park.

Features
The park features old-growth forests and five notable waterfalls: Twin Falls, Middle Twin Falls, Upper Twin Falls, Weeks Falls, and Upper Weeks Falls.

Twin Falls features a well-hidden underground run-of-the-river hydroelectric project that generates 24 MW of electricity.

Activities and amenities
Park activities include fishing, hiking, mountain biking, bird watching, and rock climbing. Completed in 2017, the Ollalie Trail added  of backcountry mountain biking.

References

External links 

Olallie State Park Washington State Parks and Recreation Commission
Olallie State Park Map Washington State Parks and Recreation Commission

State parks of Washington (state)
Parks in King County, Washington
Protected areas established in 1950